was a Japanese 5-member girl idol group. It released its debut single in 2013 and disbanded in 2019.

Members

Discography

Singles

Albums

Digital singles

"Fish Island"
"Go! Go!! Fishing"

References

External links
 
 
 Kisspoint Records

Japanese idol groups
Japanese girl groups
Japanese vocal groups
Musical groups established in 2013
Musical groups disestablished in 2019
2013 establishments in Japan
2019 disestablishments in Japan